A Night of Love by the Öresund (Swedish: En kärleksnatt vid Öresund) is a 1931 Swedish comedy film directed by Sölve Cederstrand and Ragnar Widestedt and starring Erik Berglund, Elisabeth Frisk and Theodor Berthels. It was a success at the box office.

Cast
 Erik Berglund as	Johansson
 Elisabeth Frisk as 	Maud Olsson
 Theodor Berthels as 	Charlie Ohlson
 Bengt Djurberg as 	Gunnar Ohlson
 Maritta Marke as 	Viola Wall
 Ragnar Widestedt as Julius Hagenberg
 Hugo Björne as 	Dr. Forsmark
 Eric Abrahamsson as 	Magazine editor
 Carl Deurell as 	Jakob Nobelius
 Einar Fagstad as 	Man on Hagenberg's yacht
 Mathias Taube as Doctor
 Gösta Bodin as Steward 
 Gösta Ericsson as Man in dream 
 Georg Fernqvist as 	Dr. Kramer 
 Hartwig Fock as 	Porter 
 Wictor Hagman as 	Cashier 
 Hugo Jacobsson as 	Hagenberg's friend 
 Georg Skarstedt as Krusoff - Man in dream

References

Bibliography 
 Larsson, Mariah & Marklund, Anders. Swedish Film: An Introduction and Reader. Nordic Academic Press, 2010.

External links 
 

1931 films
Swedish comedy films
1931 comedy films
1930s Swedish-language films
Films directed by Sölve Cederstrand
Films directed by Ragnar Widestedt
Swedish black-and-white films
1930s Swedish films